Henry Jarzynski (born 5 February 1931) is a Polish violinist and educator.

Early life and World War 2
Henry Jarzynski was born in Bzow, Poland in 1931, the son of agriculturalist Józef Jarzynski of Skarżyce and Marianna Marczyk of Bzow. Józef bought the "administrator's house", built in 1739, an ancient part of the Courthouse of Bzow, and after the wedding, the couple moved to Bzów, where Henryk was born in 1931. In 1939, during the Nazi invasion of Poland, Jarzynski's primary school education was interrupted, and he began playing trumpet in the symphonic band of the cement company of Zawiercie. At the age of ten his mother bought him a violin, and he travelled weekly to the village of Ogrodzieniec for violin classes with Father Stanisław Sobieraj, who was a pupil of Professor Józef Jarzębski.

1945–1968 
After World War 2, Henryk continued violin classes with Sobieraj, and soon received a scholarship from the State of Poland to study in Conservatory of the State School of Music of Kraków, where he began classes with Adam Wiernik, the concertmaster of the Radio and Televisión Orchestra of Poland in Kraków. In 1953 he began to play as first violin in the Radio and Televisión Orchestra of Poland, where he worked by 11 years. In 1954 he was accepted as a student by Professor Zenon Felinski, with whom he studied for seven years.

In 1957 Jarzynski was admitted to the Academy of Music in Kraków, continuing classes with Feliński. In 1958 he was chosen to represent Poland in the George Enescu International Violin Competition. After returning from Bucharest, he played numerous concerts with orchestra and performed live as a soloist for the National Television and the Polish Radio. In 1960 he recorded with composer Krzysztof Penderecki during the live premiere of three Miniatures for Violin and Piano. In 1961 Feliński fell ill, and Henryk continued his studies for two more years with Eugenia Umińska in the same Conservatory. He graduated in 1963, performing the violin concert of Alexander Glazunov with the Kraków Philharmonic Orchestra, and receiving his Diploma of Honor with maximum distinction "Cum Laude".

In 1963, he played in the Quartet of Kraków, and was nominated as a professor at the Academy of Music in Kraków. In 1964 he married María Millak in the Basilica of Santa María in Kraków, and they moved to Warsaw, where Henryk joined the Warsaw National Philharmonic Orchestra as first violin for four years. With this orchestra he performed in Japan and New York's Carnegie Hall, among other places. He has recorded numerous works as a solo violinist with several orchestras, as well as chamber music.

After 1968 

In 1968, Jarzynski immigrated to the Netherlands, specially invited by the conductor Willem van Otterloo to replace Herman Krebbers as concertmaster of the Residentie Orchestra. With the orchestra he went on several world tours. After a gastric illness, he switched to become the first violinist in the same orchestra until his retirement, as well as teaching.

References 

1931 births
Polish educational theorists
Polish violinists
Male violinists
Living people
21st-century violinists
21st-century male musicians